The Carlow Brewing Company, also known as O'Hara's Brewing Company, is an Irish craft brewery located in Muine Bheag, County Carlow. It is one of the largest craft breweries in Ireland.

History
After seeing the wider range of beers available in bars in the United States and Continental Europe, Seamus O'Hara established the Carlow Brewing Company in 1996 along with his brother Eamon. Due to the dominance of macro beers in Ireland at the time, the brewery was initially very export orientated. In the last few years Irish interest in the brewery, and craft beer in general, has increased. In 2017, Carlow Brewery Company acquired Craigies Cider and Hijos de Rivera, a Galician brewery, purchased a 32% stake in Carlow Brewing.

Beers
Aldi Specially Selected Traditional Irish Ale - 4.3% Irish red ale. Brewed for Aldi.
Carlow Buckley's Golden Ale - 3.8% Blonde ale.
Carlow Curim Golden Celtic Wheat Beer - 4.3% Wheat ale.
Carlow Goods Store IPA - 4.4% India pale ale.
Carlow O'Haras Celebration Stout - 6% Dry stout.
Carlow O'Haras Celtic Stout - 4.3% Dry stout.
Carlow O'Haras Druids Brew Stout - 4.7% Dry stout.
Carlow O'Haras Irish Pale Ale - 5.2% American pale ale.
Carlow O'Haras Irish Red - 4.3% Irish red ale.
Carlow O'Haras Leann Follain - 6% Dry stout.
Carlow O'Haras Smoked Ale No. 1 - 5.2% Smoked beer.
Marks and Spencer Irish Stout - 4.5% Dry stout. Brewed for Marks & Spencer.

See also
Beer in Ireland

References

External links

Beer in Ireland
Drink companies of the Republic of Ireland
County Carlow